Santa Maria Regional Transit (SMRT), formerly Santa Maria Area Transit (SMAT), is a bus service local to Santa Maria, California, providing both intracity service within Santa Maria and intercity service within Santa Barbara County, including routes to Lompoc, Buellton, and Solvang.

History
Public transit service has been operated by the city of Santa Maria since 1978; that year, Santa Maria contracted the Santa Maria Organization of Transportation Helpers (SMOOTH) to operate a single fixed route along Broadway. A second fixed route was added in 1981, and Saturday operations began in 1982. SMOOTH operated Santa Maria's local service until 2004, when the contract was awarded to MV Public Transportation, Inc. That year, Sunday service was added, along with a fare increase.

First Transit was awarded the operations and maintenance contract in 2009. The Santa Maria Transit Center, which is the origin point for many intracity and all intercity lines, was opened in 2011. Santa Maria awarded the operating contract to RATP Dev in 2018.

In December 2021, the Santa Maria City Council approved service changes to commence in January, including route consolidation, two new transfer sites, and the addition of timed transfers at the primary Transit Center hub. With the update to the services, the agency was rebranded from Santa Maria Area Transit to Santa Maria Regional Transit.

Services

Intracity routes

Notes

Intercity routes (Breeze)
In addition to service within Santa Maria, SMRT operates the Breeze bus service, which is a weekday commuter bus between Santa Maria and Lompoc via Vandenberg AFB (Route 100), and between Santa Maria and Buellton/Solvang (Route 200). Breeze riders may transfer without charge to City of Lompoc Transit (COLT), Wine Country Express, Santa Ynez Valley Transit, and SMRT buses.

Dial-a-ride
SMRT operates on-demand dial-a-ride paratransit services, covering the same area as the fixed-route local services.

Fares
Fares will rise by July 1, 2022. , transfers between SMRT routes are free, but this will be discontinued and riders will be asked to purchase 1-day passes instead.

Notes

Facilities and fleet
The SMRT Transit Center is at 400 E Boone Street, and has multiple bus bays. There are eight bus bays on the island, serving intercity routes 1, 2, 3, 4, 5, 7, 9, and 11. The four northernmost bus bays (on the curb side, next to the transit center) serve longer-distance routes (Breeze 100, Breeze 200, Guadalupe Flyer to Guadalupe, and RTA Route 10 to San Luis Obispo). The four southernmost bus bays are not allocated.

The SMRT fleet for local services is 17 mid- and full-size diesel-powered buses manufactured by Gillig, 35' and 40' long. Breeze operates with six buses: four Optima cutaways 29' feet long, and two Gillig diesels, 40' long.

References

External links
 

Public transportation in Santa Barbara County, California
Santa Maria, California
Vandenberg Space Force Base
Bus transportation in California
RATP Group